Camille Robinson-Regis is a Trinidadian and Tobagonian lawyer and politician, representing the People's National Movement. She was first elected as a Member of Parliament in the House of Representatives for Arouca South in 1992 and is the current Member of Parliament for Arouca/Maloney. She is the Minister of Planning and Development, the Lady Vice-Chairman of the People's National Movement, and the Leader of Government Business in the House of Representatives.

Early life 
Robinson-Regis attended Bishop Anstey High School before studying law at the University of the West Indies at St. Augustine. She holds a Legal Education Certificate from the Norman Manley Law School in Jamaica. She worked as corporate secretary at the National Flour Mills and was admitted to the bar of Trinidad and Tobago in 1985.

Political career 
Robinson-Regis is a member of the People's National Movement (PNM) and was appointed to the Senate in 1992. She was appointed Minister of Information on 9 January that year, becoming the youngest senator to be appointed to the cabinet. She became Minister of Consumer Affairs on 25 January 1994, a position she held until 6 October 1995. Robinson-Regis was elected to the House of Representatives for the constituency of Arouca South on 27 November 1995, a seat she held until 2007. The PNM was returned to government in December 2001 and Robinson-Regis was appointed Minister of Legal Affairs on 26 December. She became Minister of Planning and Development on 10 November 2003 and held that role until 7 November 2007.

From 2007 to 2010, Robinson-Regis served as Trinidad and Tobago's High Commissioner to Canada. The PNM was in opposition after 2010 and was appointed a temporary senator for the party on 7 February 2012. She became a full senator on 10 December 2013 and remained in the senate until 17 June 2015. She was returned to the House of Representatives for the Arouca/Maloney constituency in the 7 September 2015 general election. Robinson-Regis was appointed Minister of Planning and Development on 11 September 2015. She has been governor of the Caribbean Development Bank since 1 January 2016. She was appointed Minister of Social Development and Family Services on 30 December 2019.

Controversy
Robinson-Regis was accused of using racist rhetoric against Indo-Trinidadians and Tobagonians. In response to accusations made by the opposition  party of her party, the PNM, running a pedophile ring, Robinson-Regis at a meeting in June of 2022 was accused of using the Leader of the Opposition Kamla Persad-Bissessar's full name "Kamla Susheila Persad-Bissessar" as a way of mocking her ethnic name in an attempt to race-bait, and ridicule and mock Indo-Trinidadians and Tobagonians to take attention away from the accusations.

References 

Living people
People's National Movement politicians
Members of the House of Representatives (Trinidad and Tobago)
Members of the Senate (Trinidad and Tobago)
Government ministers of Trinidad and Tobago
University of the West Indies alumni
People associated with the Norman Manley Law School
Women government ministers of Trinidad and Tobago
High Commissioners of Trinidad and Tobago to Canada
20th-century Trinidad and Tobago women politicians
20th-century Trinidad and Tobago politicians
21st-century Trinidad and Tobago women politicians
21st-century Trinidad and Tobago politicians
Year of birth missing (living people)